KwaThema is a township south-west of Springs in the district of Ekurhuleni, Gauteng, South Africa. It was established in 1951 when Africans were forcibly removed from Payneville because it was considered by the apartheid government to be too close to a white town. The new township's layout was designed along modernist principles and became a model for many subsequent townships, although the envisaged social facilities were not implemented. The typical South African township house, the 51/9, was one of the plans developed for KwaThema. A black local authority with municipal status was established in 1984. In 1985 KwaThema experienced violent unrest and right-wing vigilante activity.

KwaThema is a multi-racial township where most of South Africa's eleven official languages are spoken but the predominant ones are Sotho and Zulu. KwaThema has given birth to many successful individuals who have helped in the development of the town.

History 
KwaThema was named after Selope Thema who was a South African political activist and leader.

Notable residents
 Andries Maseko (1955–2013), South African footballer
 Nelson Dladla (b. 1954), South African footballer
 Eudy Simelane (1977–2008), South African footballer and LGBT-rights activist, raped and murdered in the town
 Lucas Sithole (1931–1994), South African sculptor
Madi Phala (1955–2007), South African artist and designer
 Hilda Tloubatla (b. 1942), South African mbaqanga singer
Simon "Tsipa" Skosana (1957–2009), South African bantamweight champion
Innocent Mayoyo, South African goalkeeper
Joe Nina (b. 1974), South African musician and producer
Khensane Khoza (b. 1990), South African musician and vibe dealer

References

More information
 The KwaThema Project

Townships in Gauteng
Populated places in Ekurhuleni